The Post-Katrina Emergency Management Reform Act of 2006 is a federal law in the United States that reformed disaster preparedness and response, and the activities of the Federal Emergency Management Agency. It was passed after public dissatisfaction with the federal response to Hurricane Katrina in 2005. It was signed by President George W. Bush on October 4, 2006.

United States federal law
Federal Emergency Management Agency
Effects of Hurricane Katrina
2006 in American law
Acts of the 109th United States Congress